There have been two baronetcies created for persons with the surname Ewart, both in the Baronetage of the United Kingdom. One creation is extant as of 2010.

The Ewart Baronetcy, of Glenmachan House in the parish of Holywood in the County of Down and of Glenbank in the parish of Belfast in the County of Antrim, was created in the Baronetage of the United Kingdom on 13 September 1887 for Sir William Ewart, head of William Ewart & Son, linen manufacturers, of Belfast, and Member of Parliament for Belfast and Belfast North.

The Ewart Baronetcy, of White House in the parish of Hythe in the County of Southampton, was created in the Baronetage of the United Kingdom on 14 June 1910 for the soldier and courtier Major-General Sir Henry Ewart. The title became extinct on his death in 1928.

Ewart baronets, of Glenmachan House and Glenbank (1887)

Sir William Ewart, 1st Baronet (1817–1889)
Sir William Quartus Ewart, 2nd Baronet (1844–1919)
 William Quintus Ewart (1877–1900)
Sir Robert Heard Ewart, 3rd Baronet (1879–1939)
Sir Lavens Mathewson Algernon Ewart, 4th Baronet (1885–1939)
Sir Talbot Ewart, 5th Baronet (1878–1959)
Sir (William) Ivan Cecil Ewart, 6th Baronet (1919–1995)
Sir William Michael Ewart, 7th Baronet (born 1953)

Ewart baronets, of White House (1910)
Sir Henry Peter Ewart, 1st Baronet (1838–1928)

Notes

References
Kidd, Charles, Williamson, David (editors). Debrett's Peerage and Baronetage (1990 edition). New York: St Martin's Press, 1990, 

Baronetcies in the Baronetage of the United Kingdom
Extinct baronetcies in the Baronetage of the United Kingdom